Fatih Kocamis (Turkish Fatih Kocamış) is a German/Turkish retired mixed martial artist and kickboxer who fought in Pride Fighting Championships, RINGS, K-1 and M-1 Global. He trained with the Golden Glory team, alongside Chalid Arrab, Stefan Leko and Alistair Overeem.

His last fight was in 2005, against the former UFC Heavyweight Champion Kevin Randleman in which he lost by unanimous decision and later retired from fighting in 2008.

Mixed martial arts record

|-
| Loss
| align=center| 8-8-1
| Kevin Randleman
| Decision (unanimous)
| Bushido Europe - Rotterdam Rumble
| 
| align=center| 2
| align=center| 5:00
| Rotterdam, Netherlands
| 
|-
| Win
| align=center| 8-7-1
| Yahya Lalanne
| Submission (rear-naked choke)
| CFC 4 - Cage Carnage
| 
| align=center| 1
| align=center| 3:07
| Liverpool, England
| 
|-
| Win
| align=center| 7-7-1
| Alex Cook
| TKO (corner stoppage)
| CFC 2 - Cage Carnage
| 
| align=center| 2
| align=center| N/A
| Liverpool, England
| 
|-
| Win
| align=center| 6-7-1
| Mark Epstein
| TKO (punches)
| 2H2H - 2 Hot 2 Handle
| 
| align=center| N/A
| align=center| N/A
| Rotterdam, Netherlands
| 
|-
| Win
| align=center| 5-7-1
| Dave Vader
| Submission
| It's Showtime - Amsterdam Arena
| 
| align=center| 1
| align=center| 0:36
| Amsterdam, Netherlands
| 
|-
| Win
| align=center| 4-7-1
| Arman Gambaryan
| Submission (punches)
| M-1 MFC - Russia vs. The World 7
| 
| align=center| 1
| align=center| 8:00
| St. Petersburg, Russia
| 
|-
| Win
| align=center| 3-7-1
| Takahiro Oba
| Decision (unanimous)
| Pride The Best Vol.2
| 
| align=center| 2
| align=center| 5:00
| Tokyo, Japan
| 
|-
| Loss
| align=center| 2-7-1
| Rodney Glunder
| Decision
| 2H2H 4 - Simply the Best 4
| 
| align=center| 2
| align=center| 3:00
| Rotterdam, Netherlands
| 
|-
| Draw
| align=center| 2-6-1
| Arman Gambaryan
| Draw
| M-1 MFC - European Championship 2002
| 
| align=center| 1
| align=center| 10:00
| St. Petersburg, Russia
| 
|-
| Loss
| align=center| 2-6
| Islam Dadalov
| Submission (headbutt)
| IAFC - Pankration World Championship 2001
| 
| align=center| 1
| align=center| 0:34
| Yaroslavl, Russia
| 
|-
| Loss
| align=center| 2-5
| Joop Kasteel
| Submission (armbar)
| Rings Holland: Some Like It Hard
| 
| align=center| 1
| align=center| 1:57
| Utrecht City, Netherlands
| 
|-
| Loss
| align=center| 2-4
| Moise Rimbon
| Decision (1-0 points)
| 2H2H 3 - Hotter Than Hot
| 
| align=center| 2
| align=center| 5:00
| Rotterdam, Netherlands
| 
|-
| Win
| align=center| 2-3
| Ed de Kruijf
| KO (punches)
| 2H2H 2 - Simply The Best
| 
| align=center| 1
| align=center| 7:00
| Rotterdam, Netherlands
| 
|-
| Loss
| align=center| 1-3
| Valentijn Overeem
| KO (punch)
| Rings Holland: Di Capo Di Tutti Capi
| 
| align=center| 2
| align=center| 0:47
| Utrecht City, Netherlands
| 
|-
| Loss
| align=center| 1-2
| Romazi Korkelia
| TKO (cut)
| IAFC - Pankration World Championship 2000 [Day 2]
| 
| align=center| 1
| align=center| N/A
| Moscow, Russia
| 
|-
| Loss
| align=center| 1-1
| Mikhail Avetisyan
| TKO
| Seikendo - Hard Battle
| 
| align=center| 1
| align=center| 11:26
| Yokogama, Japan
| 
|-
| Win
| align=center| 1-0
| Niels Bolle
| Submission (armbar)
| IMA - Back to the Roots
| 
| align=center| N/A
| align=center| N/A
| Hoofddorp, Netherlands
|

References

External links
 

German male mixed martial artists
Turkish male mixed martial artists
Mixed martial artists utilizing kickboxing
Mixed martial artists utilizing vale tudo
German male kickboxers
Turkish male kickboxers
1974 births
Living people